Leon Neil Morgan (born 14 February 1979) is an English cricketer.  Morgan is a right-handed batsman.  He was born at Willesborough, Kent.

Morgan represented the Kent Cricket Board in 3 List A matches.  These came against the Leicestershire Cricket Board in the 2nd round of the 2002 Cheltenham & Gloucester Trophy which was held in 2001, and against the same opposition in the 2nd round of the 2003 Cheltenham & Gloucester Trophy which was held in 2002.  His final List A match came against Derbyshire in the 3rd round of the same competition which was played in 2003.  In his 3 List A matches, he scored 66 runs at a batting average of 33.00, with a high score of 27.  In the field he took a single catch.

He currently plays club cricket for Folkestone Cricket Club in the Kent Cricket League.

References

External links
Leon Morgan at Cricinfo
Leon Morgan at CricketArchive

1979 births
Living people
People from Willesborough
English cricketers
Kent Cricket Board cricketers